Charles Hanford Blakeney (December 2, 1888 – May 23, 1961) was a newspaper owner and political figure in New Brunswick, Canada. He represented the city of Moncton in the Legislative Assembly of New Brunswick from 1935 to 1945 as a Liberal member.

He was born in Moncton, New Brunswick to Sherman Blakeney and Alice Warman, and educated at Mount Allison University. In 1916, he married Lilith Lockhart. Blakeney was mayor of Moncton in 1929 and from 1931 to 1934. He also served as president of the Board of Trade. He was named to the province's Executive Council as Minister of Education in 1940.

References 

Canadian Parliamentary Guide, 1940, AL Normandin

1888 births
1961 deaths
20th-century Canadian legislators
Mayors of Moncton
New Brunswick Liberal Association MLAs
Mount Allison University alumni